Gogolloc (Serbian Cyrillic:  Гоголовце ) is a village in Kamenica municipality, Kosovo. It is located in the Gollak mountains. It has 10 inhabitants, all of whom are Serbs.

References 

Villages in Kamenica, Kosovo